Murray Town Rovers is a Sierra Leonean football club from Murray Town, a neighborhood of Freetown, Sierra Leone. The club is currently playing in the Sierra Leone National First Division, the second highest football league in Sierra Leone.

References

Football clubs in Sierra Leone
Sport in Freetown